The heavyweight class was a judo event held as part of the Judo at the 1964 Summer Olympics programme. The weight class was the heaviest contested, and allowed judokas over eighty kilograms. The competition was held on Thursday, October 22, 1964.

Fourteen judokas from twelve nations competed. The final between Inokuma and Rogers was a draw with Inokuma given a preference for a slightly higher activity. Little occurred in the first 10 minutes, and the referee Charles Palmer threatened to disqualify both and award no gold medal, yet with little effect.

Medalists

Results

Elimination round

The fifteen competitors were divided into five pools of three. Each pool played a round-robin tournament, with the winner of the pool advancing to the quarterfinals.

Pool A

Pool B

Pool C

Pool D

Teck Bee Age did not compete.

Pool E

Knockout rounds

The remaining five judokas competed in a single elimination bracket. Three received a bye in the quarterfinals, leaving only one match. The loser of that match placed 5th overall, while both losers in the semifinals won bronze medals.

References

Sources

External links
 

M81
Judo at the Summer Olympics Men's Heavyweight